S. Thomas Satyamurthi was an Indian zoologist who served as Superintendent of the Government Museum, Chennai and the Connemara Public Library from 1960 to 1978.

References 

 

20th-century Indian zoologists
Scientists from Chennai